Macro-Jê (also spelled Macro-Gê) is a medium-sized language family in South America, mostly in Brazil but also in the Chiquitanía region in Santa Cruz, Bolivia, as well as (formerly) in small parts of Argentina and Paraguay. It is centered on the Jê language family, with most other branches currently being single languages due to recent extinctions.

Families
The Macro-Jê family was first proposed in 1926, and has undergone moderate modifications since then. Kaufman (1990) finds the proposal "probable".

Jê
Jeikó †
Krenák (Botocudo)
Krenak (10 speakers)
Borôroan
Bororo
Bororo (1,400 speakers)
Umotína †
Otuke †
Kamakã †
Karajá (2,700 speakers)
Karirí †
Maxakalían
Ofayé (2 speakers)
Purían †
Rikbaktsá
Yabutian [moribund]

Eduardo Ribeiro of the University of Chicago finds no evidence to classify Fulniô (Yatê) and Guató as Macro-Jê, pace Kaufman, nor Otí, pace Greenberg. Ribeiro does include Chiquitano, pace Rodrigues.

These languages share irregular morphology with the Tupi and Carib families, and Rodrigues (2000) and Ribeiro connect them all as a Je–Tupi–Carib family. 

Pache (2018) suggests a distant genetic relationship between Macro-Jê and Chibchan.

Glottolog accepts Jean, Krenak (Aimore), Karaja, Maxakalian, Ofaie, Rikbaktsa, and Yabutian (Jabuti). Lexical parallels with Kamakanan and Purian have yet to be corroborated with reconstructions; the similarities with Purian disappear once Coropo is reclassified as Maxakalian. It notes suggestive grammatical similarities with Bororoan, Kariri, and Chiquitano, of the kind also shared with Tupian and Cariban, but little lexical evidence.

Jolkesky (2016)
Jolkesky (2016) proposes the following internal classification of Macro-Jê:

Macro-Jê
Borum † 
Ofaye
Rikbaktsa
Yate
Bororo
Bororo
Otuke †
Umutina †
Maxakali
Malali †
Maxakali-Pataxo
Maxakali
Pataxo †
Kamakã †
Masakara †
Kamakã-Menien †
Kamakã †
Menien †
Kariri †
Dzubukua †
Kipea †
Xoko †
Macro-Jê, Nuclear
Besiro (Chiquitano)
Jeoromitxi-Arikapu (Yabutian): Arikapu; Jeoromitxi
Karaja: Javae; Karaja; Xambioa
Jê
Jê, Central
Akroa †
Xakriaba †
Xavante
Xerente
Jeiko †
Jê, Southern
Ingain: Ingain †; Kimda †
Kaingang-Xokleng
Kaingang: Kaingang; Kaingang Paulista
Xokleng
Jê, Northern
Apinaje
Kayapo: Mẽbengokre; Xikrin
Panara
Suya-Tapayuna: Suya; Tapayuna
Timbira: Apãniekra; Kraho; Krẽje †; Krĩkati; Parkateje; Pykobje; Ramkokamekra

Nikulin (2020)
Nikulin (2020) proposes the following internal classification of Macro-Jê:

Macro-Jê
Karajá
Western
Mato Grosso
Ofayé
Rikbáktsa
Jabutí
Arikapú
Djeoromitxí
Eastern
? Jaikó
Jê (see)
Akuwẽ; Northern Jê, Panará
Ingain; Southern Jê
Trans–São Francisco
Borum
Krenák
Maxakalí
Malalí
Nuclear Maxakalí
Maxakalí
Ritual Maxakalí; Makoní
Pataxó; Pataxó-Hãhãhãe
Koropó
? Kamakã (possibly part of Trans-São Francisco)
Masakará
Southern Kamakã
Menien
Kamakã; Kotoxó/Mongoyó

Nikulin (2020) does not accept the following languages and language families as part of Macro-Jê.

Boróro
Yaathê (Fulniô)
Purí
Guató
Karirí
Otí

However, Nikulin (2020) considers Chiquitano to be a sister of Macro-Jê.

Proto-language

Proto-Macro-Jê is notable for having relatively few consonants and a large vocalic inventory. There are also complex onsets with rhotics, as well as contrastive nasalization for vowels.

Phonological inventory of Proto-Macro-Jê as reconstructed by Nikulin (2020):

Consonants: */p, m, w, t, n, r, c, ñ, j, k, ŋ/
Complex onsets: */pr, mr, kr, ŋr/
Vowels: */a, â, ə, ə̂, y, o, ô, u, e, ê, i, ə̃, ỹ, ũ, ẽ, ĩ/
Maximal syllable structure: */CrVC°/, where /°/ = echo vowel

For a list of Proto-Macro-Jê reconstructions by Nikulin (2020), see the corresponding Portuguese article.

Language contact
Many Macro-Jê languages have been in contact with various languages of the Tupí-Guaraní family, which resulted in lexical borrowings. For instance, Ribeiro (2012) finds a number of Apyãwa loanwords in Karajá (such as bèhyra ‘carrying basket’, kòmỹdawyra ‘andu beans’, hãrara ‘macaw (sp.)’, tarawè ‘parakeet (sp.)’, txakohi ‘Txakohi ceremonial mask’, hyty ‘garbage (Javaé dialect)’) as well as several Karajá loans in Apyãwa (tãtã ‘banana’, tori ‘White man’, marara ‘turtle stew’, irãwore ‘Irabure ceremonial mask’), Parakanã, and Asuriní of Trocará (sata ‘banana’, toria ‘White man’). Loans from one of the Língua Geral varieties (Língua Geral Paulista or Língua Geral Amazônica) have been found in Karajá (jykyra ‘salt’, mỹkawa ‘firearm’, brùrè ‘hoe’, kòmỹta ‘beans’, mabèra ‘paper (Xambioá dialect)’, ĩtajuwa ‘money (dated)’), Maxakalí (ãmãnex ‘priest’, tãyũmak ‘money’, kãmãnok ‘horse’, tapayõg ‘Black man’), Ritual Maxakalí (kõnõmĩy ‘boy’, kõyãg ‘woman’, petup ‘tobacco’, pakõm ‘banana’, tapuux ‘foreigner’, xetukxeka ‘potato’), and Krenak (tuŋ ‘flea’, krai ‘non-Indigenous person, foreigner’). Chiquitano has borrowed extensively from an unidentified Tupí-Guaraní variety; one example is Chiquitano takones [takoˈnɛs] ‘sugarcane’, borrowed from a form close to Paraguayan Guaraní takuare'ẽ ‘sugarcane’.

Some Macro-Jê languages from different branches have secondarily contacted with each other, also resulting in lexical loans. Ribeiro (2012), for instance, identifies several Karajá loans in Mẽbêngôkre, especially in the dialect spoken by the Xikrin group. These loans are thought to have entered Mẽbêngôkre from the variety spoken by the Xambioá group of the Karajá people. Examples include warikoko (Kayapó dialect) or watkoko (Xikrin dialect) ‘tobacco pipe’, rara ‘kind of basket’, wiwi ‘song, chant’, bikwa ‘relative, friend’, bero ‘puba flour’, borrowed from Karajá werikòkò, lala, wii, bikòwa, bèrò.

Loanwords from Brazilian Portuguese are found in many, if not all, Macro-Jê languages spoken in Brazil. Examples from Maxakalí include kapex ‘coffee’, komenok ‘blanket’, kapitõg ‘captain’, pẽyõg ‘beans’, mug ‘bank’, tenemiyam ‘TV’ (borrowed from Portuguese café, cobertor, capitão, feijão, banco, televisão); in Karajá, Ribeiro (2012) documents the Portuguese loans nieru ‘money’ and maritò ‘suit, jacket’ (from dinheiro, paletó), among others.

There is a significant number of loanwords from Chiquitano or from an extinct variety close to Chiquitano in Camba Spanish, including bi ‘genipa’, masi ‘squirrel’, peni ‘lizard’, peta ‘turtle, tortoise’, jachi ‘chicha leftover’, jichi ‘worm; jichi spirit’, among many others.

Jolkesky (2016) notes that there are lexical similarities with Arawakan languages due to contact.

See also

Je–Tupi–Carib languages
Trans–São Francisco languages

References

Further reading

Antunes, M. A. D. (1999). Pequeno dicionário indígena Maxakali-Português / Português Maxakali. Juiz de Fora.
Arikapú, M.; Arikapú, N.; Van Der Voort, H.; Alves, A. C. F. (2010). Vocabulário Arikapú-Português. (Cadernos de Etnolingüística. Série Monografias, 1).
 Davis, Irvine. “Some Macro-Jê Relationships”. In: South American Indian Languages: Retrospect and Prospect. Edited by Harriet E. Manelis Klein and Louisa R. Stark. University of Texas Press, 1985. pp. 286–303. http://www.jstor.org/stable/10.7560/775923.9.
de Queiroz, J. M. C. (2008). Aspectos da fonologia Dzubukuá. Recife: Universidade Federal de Pernambuco. (Masters dissertation).
de Queiroz, J. M. C. (2012). Um estudo gramatical da língua Dzubukuá, família Karirí. Universidade Federal da Paraíba. (Doctoral dissertation).
Emmerich, Ch.; Monserrat. R. M. F. (1973). Vocabulário Botocudo. Rio de Janeiro: Museu Nacional. (Manuscript).
Fortune, D. L. (1973). Gramática karajá: um estudo preliminar em forma transformacional. Série linguística, 1:101-161. Brasília: Summer Institute of Linguistics.
Hall, Joan And Macleod, Ruth Alice And Mitchell, Valerie. (2004). Pequeno dicionário xavánte-português, português-xavánte. Brasília: Summer Institute of Linguistics.
Jolkesky, M. P. V. (2010). Reconstrução fonológica e lexical do Proto-Jê Meridional. Universidade Estadual de Campinas.
Krieger, W. B.; Krieger, G. C. (1994). Dicionário escolar Xerente-Português, Porturguês-Xerente. Rio de Janeiro: Junta das Missões Nacionais da Convenção Batista Brasileira.
Lachnitt, G. (1987). Romnhitsi'ubumro: a'uwê mreme = waradzu mreme: Dicionário xavante-português. Campo Grande: Missão Salesiana de Mato Grosso.
Martins, A. M. S. (2007). Revisão da família lingüística Kamakã proposta por Chestmir Loukotka. Brasília: University de Brasília. (Masters dissertation).
 Martins, Andérbio Márcio Silva; Ana Suelly Arruda Câmara Cabral; Maxwel Gomes Miranda; Lucivaldo Silva da Costa; e Lidiane Szerwinsk Camargos (2016). “O TRONCO MACRO-JÊ: HIPÓTESES E CONTRIBUIÇÕES DE ARYON DALL’IGNA RODRIGUES”. In: Fragmentum, nº 46 (agosto): 101-35. https://doi.org/10.5902/fragmentum.v0i46.23392.
Monteiro, C. (1948). Vocabulário Português-Botocudo. Boletim do Museu Paulista, Documentação Lingüística, 2:1-62.
Nonato, R.; Suyá, J.; Suyá, K. (2012). Dicionário Kĩsêdjê-Português. Rio de Janeiro: Museu do Indio.
Oliveira, C.; Whan, Ch. (coords.) (2013). Dicionário Enciclopédico Inyrybè/Karajá - Português Brasileiro. Rio de Janeiro: Museo do índio.
Oliveira. M. D. (2006). Ofayé, a língua do povo do mel: Fonologia e Gramática. Maceió: Universidade Federal de Alagoas. (Doctoral dissertation).
Popovich, A. H.; Popovich, F. B. (2005). Dicionário Maxakalí-Português; Glossário Português-Maxakalí. Brasil: SIL.
Ribeiro, E. R. (2012). A grammar of Karajá. Chicago: University of Chicago. (Doctoral dissertation).
Ribeiro, M. A. (2008). Dicionário Djeoromitxi-Português: registro da língua do povo Jabuti. Guajará-Mirim: Universidade Federal de Rondônia. (Masters dissertation).
Ribeiro, R. M. L. (2008). Dicionário Arikapu/Português - Registro de uma língua indígena amazônica. Guajará-Mirim: Universidade Federal de Rondônia. (Masters dissertation).
Rudolph, B. (1909). Wörterbuch der Botokudensprache. Hamburg: Fr. W. Thaden.
Sá, A. C. (2000). Dicionário Iatê-Português. Recife: Garcia.
Silva, L. de J. (2011). Morphosyntaxe du Rikbaktsa. Paris: Université Denis Diderot - Paris 7. (Doctoral dissertation).
Sekelj, T. (n.d.). Aruá, Makurap, Žabotí, Arikapó, Tuparí. (Manuscript).

External links 
 Bibliografia Macro-Jê Online
 The Jê-cyclopedia: Macro-Jê languages and cultures, from past to present

 
Indigenous languages of South America (Central)
Proposed language families